Flacourtia is a genus of flowering plants in the family Salicaceae. It was previously placed in the now defunct family Flacourtiaceae. The generic name honors Étienne de Flacourt (1607–1660), a governor of Madagascar. It contains 15 species of shrubs and small trees that are native to the African and Asian tropics and subtropics. Several species, especially F. indica, are cultivated as ornamentals and for their fruits. The trunks of small trees are often guarded by branching spines.

Selected species
 Flacourtia indica (Burm.f.) Merr. (southern Asia, Madagascar)
 Flacourtia inermis Roxb.; Batoko plum
 Flacourtia jangomas (Lour.) Raeusch. – Indian coffee plum (Tropical Asia)
 Flacourtia montana J.Graham
Flacourtia rukam Zoll. & Moritzi – Rukam (Indonesia)

Formerly placed here

Xylosma flexuosa (Kunth) Hemsl. (as F. flexuosa Kunth)

References

External links

 
Salicaceae genera